Bogoslovskoe Cemetery  is a cemetery in Saint Petersburg, Russia.

The name comes from the church of John the Apostle, (Ioann Bogoslov), which from the early 18th century had a burial ground attached, mostly for those who died in the nearby military hospital. The church and cemetery were closed in 1788 and the land sold off into private ownership. In 1841 the city acquired a new plot of land for a cemetery, and named it after the previous one. In 1844, the Most Holy Synod approved the building of a new stone church, but no funds were available. In 1853-1854 a small two-storey chapel was built.

In 1915–1916, a new wooden three-fronted church of John the Apostle was built at the cemetery to the design of architect . The church was closed during the Soviet era, and finally looted and demolished in 1938, along with part of the cemetery, as it lay within an area closed off for military purposes.  In Soviet times the cemetery became the burial place of many prominent scientists, cultural figures, and military officials. It was also the site of several mass graves of those who died during the siege of Leningrad. These are found in the northern part of the cemetery, marked by a hill topped with a small obelisk. In October 2000, a newly rebuilt wooden church of John the Apostle was consecrated.

Interments

 Aleksandr Aleksandrov (1912–1999),  mathematician, physicist and philosopher
 Nikolay Anichkov (1885–1964), pathologist, Anitschkow cells
 Aleksandr Babaev (1923–1985), fighter pilot
 Yevgeni Belosheikin (1966–1999), hockey player
 Vitaly Bianki (1894–1959), children's and nature writer
 Mikhail Bonch-Bruevich (1888–1940), engineer, scientist, and professor
 Piotr Buchkin (1886–1965), painter, illustrator, and art teacher
 Boris Bychowsky (1908–1974), parasitologist
 Yevgeny Charushin (1901–1965), illustrator and author of children's literature
 Aleksandr Chernyshyov (1882–1940), electrical engineer
 Viktor Chistiakov (1943–1972), actor
 Igor M. Diakonoff (1915–1999),  historian, linguist, and translator
 Ivan Dzerzhinsky (1909–1978), composer
 Boris Eikhenbaum (1886–1959), literary scholar and historian
 Fridrikh Ermler (1898–1967), film director, actor, and screenwriter
 Olga Freidenberg (1890–1955), philologist
 Valerian Frolov (1895–1961), military officer
 Andrey Gagarin (1934–2011), physicist
 Vladimir Gardin (1877–1965), film director and actor
 Aleksei German (1938–2013), director and screenwriter
 Yuri German (1910–1967), writer, playwright, screenwriter, and journalist
 Mikhail Gorsheniov (1973–2013), singer and composer, Korol i Shut
 Vladimir Govyrin (1924–1994), physiologist
 Edouard Grikurov (1907–1982), conductor
 Ivan Ivanov (1862–1939), mathematician
 Sergei Izotov (1917–1983), scientist and aircraft designer
 Gennadi Kazansky (1910–1983), film director
 Lidia Klement (1937–1964), singer
 Mikhail Kovalyov (1897–1967), military officer
 Vladimir Konashevich (1888–1963), graphic artist and illustrator
 Boris Konstantinov (1910–1969), physicist
 Boris Korneev (1922–1973), painter and art teacher
 Nikolai Korotkov (1874–1920), surgeon, pioneer of vascular surgery
 Nikolai Kulakov (1908–1976), naval officer
 Ivan Ladyga (1920–2010), military officer
 Kirill Lavrov (1925–2007), film and theatre actor and director
 Vladimir Lebedev (1891–1967), painter
 Vladimir Lemeshev (1911–1976), football player and coach
 Nikolay Lunin (1907–1970), naval officer
 Anatoly Marienhof (1897–1962),  poet, novelist and playwright
 Alexander Marinesko (1913–1963), naval officer
 Ivan Meshcherskiy (1859–1935), mathematician
 Yevgeny Mravinsky (1903–1988), conductor
 Dmitry Nelyubin, (1971–2005), track cyclist
 Vladimir Myasishchev (1893–1973), psychologist and developmental psychologist
 Joseph Orbeli (1887–1961), orientalist, academician
 Leon Orbeli (1882–1958), physiologist
 Maria Orbeli (1916–1949), physicist
 Yevgeny Pavlovsky (1884–1965), zoologist, entomologist
 Alexei Pakhomov (1900–1973), avant garde painter
 Alexander Prokofyev (1900–1971), poet
 Alexander "Ricochet" Aksyonov (1964–2007), singer-songwriter
 Zoya Rozhdestvenskaya (1906–1953), singer
 Vasily Shorin (1871–1938), military officer
 Terentii Shtykov (1907–1964), military officer
 Yelena Shushunova (1969–2018), gymnast
 Evgeny Schwartz (1896–1958), writer and playwright
 Nikolai Simoniak (1901–1956), military officer
 Alexander Sokolov (1918–1973), painter and art teacher
 Nikolay Solovyov (1931–2007), wrestler
 Nikolai Suetin (1897–1954), artist
 Vasily Tolstikov (1917–2003), diplomat and Communist Party official
 Alexander Tolush (1910–1969), chess grandmaster
 Vladimir Trusenyov (1931–2001), discus thrower
 Viktor Tsoi (1962–1990), singer and songwriter, Kino
 Lev Uspensky (1900–1978), writer and philologist
 Eduard Vinokurov (1942–2010), Olympic sabre fencer
 Leonid Yakobson (1904–1975), ballet choreographer
 Mikhail Zalessky (1877–1946), paleontologist and paleobotanist

References

External links

 

Cemeteries in Saint Petersburg
1841 establishments in the Russian Empire